Tibby Creek is a stream in the U.S. state of Mississippi. It is a tributary to the Noxubee River.

Tibby is a name derived from the Choctaw language purported to mean either (sources vary) "icy creek" or "to fight".

References

Rivers of Mississippi
Rivers of Noxubee County, Mississippi
Mississippi placenames of Native American origin